Julie M. Smith (born May 10, 1968) is an American, former collegiate All-American, gold-medal winning Olympian softball player and coach. Smith played college softball for Texas A&M and Fresno State. She represented Team USA at the 1996 Summer Olympics and won a gold medal. Smith most recently served as the head softball coach and assistant athletic director at the University of La Verne.

Playing career
Smith was born in Glendora, California, and competed at the 1996 Summer Olympics in Atlanta where she won a gold medal with Team USA.

Smith played college softball at Texas A&M where she won a national championship at the 1987 Women's College World Series and Fresno State in the Big West Conference from 1990 to 1991. Along with a title, Smith was also named to All-Tournament team at the Women's College World Series in all three of her appearances.

Coaching career
Smith served as the general manager for the New York/New Jersey Juggernaut in 2005. 
On August 3, 2007, Smith was named the head softball coach at the University of La Verne. On November 29, 2018, Smith stepped down as head coach after 11 years. During her career she compiled a record of 287–185 and led her teams to three SCIAC regular season championships, three SCIAC postseason tournament titles, and made the NCAA Playoffs four times.

Statistics
Texas A&M Aggies & Fresno State Bulldogs

References

External links
 
 

1968 births
Living people
Softball players from California
Olympic softball players of the United States
Softball players at the 1996 Summer Olympics
Olympic gold medalists for the United States in softball
Texas A&M Aggies softball players
American softball coaches
La Verne Leopards softball coaches
Medalists at the 1996 Summer Olympics